The chhatra (from , meaning "umbrella") is an auspicious symbol in Hinduism, Jainism and Buddhism.

The chhatra in various traditions
According to Hindu mythology, it is the emblem of Varuna, also considered an embodiment of kingship. Chhatra is also a deity, yidam and ishta-devata.  In various Dharmic traditions it is an accoutrement of chakravartin. A number of deities are depicted with chhatra, and they include Revanta, Surya, and Vishnu (in his Vamana avatar). The chhatra is cordoned amongst the symbols that approach universality within the numerous octavalent suites or sets of Ashtamangala, e.g., in the Digambar Jain tradition, and the Vajrayana tradition.

In Dharmic tradition iconography, traditional Tibetan medicine thangkas and Ayurvedic diagrams, the chhatra is uniformly represented as the Sahasrara.

In Vajrayana Buddhism, the umbrella or parasol is included in the 'Eight Auspicious Signs' or Ashtamangala.

The chhatra shares a similar symbolic value to the baldachin, refer image of Vishvakarman.

In Burmese culture, the hti is considered regalia, and also crowns Burmese pagodas.

The Royal Nine-Tiered Umbrella is one part of the royal regalia of Thailand, and appears in connection with this role in the logo of Royal Umbrella rice.

Gallery

See also
 Hti
 Royal Nine-Tiered Umbrella

Notes

References

Footnotes

Bibliography
Dictionary of Hindu Lore and Legend by Anna Dallapiccola
General Buddhist Symbols

External links

Buddhist ritual implements
Buddhist symbols
Ritual weapons
Hindu symbols
Indian iconography
Jain symbols